Ictericodes japonicus is a species of tephritid or fruit flies in the genus Ictericodes of the family Tephritidae.

Distribution
Central & East Europe to Central Asia & Caucasus, Japan.

References

Tephritinae
Insects described in 1830
Diptera of Europe
Diptera of Asia